Sarafina! is a 1992 musical drama film based on Mbongeni Ngema's 1987 musical of the same name. The film was directed by Darrell Roodt and written by Ngema and William Nicholson, and stars Leleti Khumalo, Miriam Makeba, John Kani, Ngema, and Whoopi Goldberg; Khumalo reprises her role from the stage performance.

An international co-production of the South Africa, United States, France, and the United Kingdom, the film premiered on 11 May 1992, at the Cannes Film Festival.

Plot
The plot centres on students involved in the Soweto Uprising, in opposition to the implementation of Afrikaans as the language of instruction in schools.

The character Sarafina (Leleti Khumalo) feels shame at her mother's (Miriam Makeba) acceptance of her role as domestic servant in a white household in apartheid South Africa, and inspires her peers to rise up in protest, especially after her inspirational teacher, Mary Masombuka (Whoopi Goldberg) is imprisoned. In the opening scene, Sarafina is seen talking while staring at Nelson Mandela's picture, at the time the South African icon was still imprisoned. In a later scene Sarafina is again talking while staring at Mandela's picture on the wall, criticizing him for being gone for a long time and not responding to the nation's pleas, idolising him as someone who can change the horrific situation that South Africa is in.

Cast 
 Whoopi Goldberg as Mary Masombuka
 Miriam Makeba as Angelina
 John Kani as School Principal
 Mbongeni Ngema as Sabela
 Leleti Khumalo as Sarafina

Production

Filming
Producer Anant Singh acquired the film rights to the Broadway musical Sarafina! After no Hollywood studio was willing to finance it, Singh raised the funds himself, with the BBC and the French company Revcom being among the investors. By the time filming started, Nelson Mandela was freed and apartheid was abolished, though racial tensions were still high. Said director Darrell Roodt: “Though our project is still confrontational and angry, it’s told with more hope and a spirit of reconciliation.” At the 1991 Cannes Film Festival, Whoopi Goldberg was announced to play Mary Masombuka; she was reportedly the first African-American actress to film a project in South Africa.

The film was shot on location at Morris Isaacson High School in Soweto, South Africa. Morris Isaacson was a center of the 1976 Soweto student uprisings.  Many of the extras and some of the cast members participated in the real-life resistance in Soweto, while Miriam Makeba was a political exile. Singh told the press that the film would be a different tackling of apartheid than other films about the subject, where they were told from a white perspective. "When people ask me why there is no good white in the movie," said Singh, "I tell them that this is one movie that isn’t about whites. Many of the actors have been arrested, had the police break down their doors in the middle of the night. Almost everyone had either first or second-hand experience with the movement. The kids in the cast were performing what they lived.” Given the racism that was still prevalent in South Africa post-apartheid, there were concerns that the filming of scenes showing protests and rioting would fan the flames. To avert this, the prop military vehicles were emblazoned with the insignia "Sarafina!" to ensure the public that a movie was being filmed there.

In the United States, the film had some of the more graphic scenes removed to avoid a more restrictive rating. The MPAA rated the film PG-13 for "scenes of apartheid-driven violence;" the Director's Cut, which was released on LaserDisc in 1993, was rated R for "strong scenes of violence."

Reception

Accolades
The film was screened out of competition at the 1992 Cannes Film Festival, where it was greeted with a standing ovation. Whoopi Goldberg mentioned on The Daily Show with Trevor Noah (who said the movie was a hit in South Africa), that the LA riots due to Rodney King happened at the same time that Sarafina! was released which hampered the film's chance of success in the US. The film holds a 60% "certified fresh" score on Rotten Tomatoes.

Release
Miramax Films acquired the domestic rights to Sarafina! in February 1992 after seeing 40 minutes of footage; in turn, Miramax licensed those rights to Disney after the film was screened at Cannes. The film was released on 18 September 1992. Sarafina! was re-released in South Africa on 16 June 2006 to commemorate the 30th anniversary of the Soweto uprising in Soweto. The re-mastered director's cut is not very different from the original, except for the inclusion of one scene that was cut from the original, between Leleti Khumalo (Sarafina) and Miriam Makeba (Sarafina's mother), which includes a musical number "Thank You Mama".

Box office
Sarafina! grossed $7,306,242 in the United States and Canada. It was the fourth-highest grossing film in South Africa for the year with a gross of $1.33 million.

Notes

References

External links
 
 

1990s musical comedy-drama films
1992 drama films
1992 films
American musical comedy-drama films
Apartheid films
BBC Film films
English-language South African films
Films about race and ethnicity
Films directed by Darrell Roodt
Films scored by Stanley Myers
Films set in 1976
Films set in South Africa
Films shot in Gauteng
Hollywood Pictures films
Miramax films
South African comedy-drama films
South African films based on plays
Warner Bros. films
1990s English-language films
South African musical films
1990s American films